Gingicithara lyrica is a species of sea snail, a marine gastropod mollusk in the family Mangeliidae.

Description
The shell of the adult snail attains 11 mm.

The whorls are not shouldered. They are lightly longitudinally ribbed, crossed by revolving elevated striae. The color of the shell is light brown, indistinctly banded with orange-brown.

Distribution
This marine species occurs off the Philippines, New Caledonia and Queensland, Australia.

References

 Reeve, L.A. 1846. Monograph of the genus Mangelia. pls 1–8 in Reeve, L.A. (ed). Conchologia Iconica. London : L. Reeve & Co. Vol. 3.
 Smith, E.A. 1884. Mollusca. pp. 34–116, 487–508, 657–659, pls 4–7. In, Report on the Zoological Collections made in the Indo-Pacific Ocean during the voyage of the H.M.S. 'Alert ' 1881–2. London : British Museum Trustees, printed by Taylor & Francis. 
 Melvill, J.C. 1917. A revision of the Turridae (Pleurotomidae) occurring in the Persian Gulf, Gulf of Oman and North Arabian Sea as evidenced mostly through the results of dredgings carried out by Mr. F.W. Townsend, 1893–1914. Proceedings of the Malacological Society of London 12(4–5): 140–201
 Cernohorsky, W.O. 1978. Tropical Pacific Marine Shells. Sydney : Pacific Publications 352 pp., 68 pls. 
 Springsteen, F.J. & Leobrera, F.M. 1986. Shells of the Philippines. Manila : Carfel Seashell Museum 377 pp., 100 pls.
 Payri & Richer de Forges (2007), Compendium of Marine Species of New Caledonia; Document Scientifiques et Techniques II 7 volume special

External links
  Hedley, C. 1922. A revision of the Australian Turridae. Records of the Australian Museum 13(6): 213–359, pls 42–56 
 
  Tucker, J.K. 2004 Catalog of recent and fossil turrids (Mollusca: Gastropoda). Zootaxa 682:1–1295.
 Kilburn R.N. 1992. Turridae (Mollusca: Gastropoda) of southern Africa and Mozambique. Part 6. Subfamily Mangeliinae, section 1. Annals of the Natal Museum, 33: 461–575

lyrica
Gastropods described in 1846